Jacob Nicolaas Olivier Immelman (born ) is a South African rugby union player for Romanian SuperLiga side CSM Baia Mare. His regular position is flank.

References

External links
 
 
 

South African rugby union players
Living people
1993 births
People from Upington
Rugby union flankers
Free State Cheetahs players
SWD Eagles players
Rugby union players from the Northern Cape